The "Luigi Pigorini" National Museum of Prehistory and Ethnography is a public and research museum located in Rome, Italy. Established in 1875 and opened in 1876  by Luigi Pigorini, from 2016 it is one of the four museums inside the Museum of Civilizations' network, and is currently directed by Andrea Viliani.

Holdings 
One important collection of the Pigorini houses is Neolithic artifacts from Lake Bracciano. Another is the early ethnographic collection of Athanasius Kircher. The museum also conserves the Praeneste fibula, the oldest known inscription in the Latin language.

References

Further reading
Brizzi, Bruno [ed.] 1976 The Pigorini Museum Rome, Quasar. 424 page catalogue with hundreds of plates in colour and black and white.

External links
 Pigorini website
 European Virtual Museum
 

National museums of Italy
Archaeological museums in Italy
Ethnographic museums in Italy
Museums in Rome
Pigorini, Luigi National Museum of Prehistory and Ethnography
Museums established in 1876
1876 establishments in Italy
Rome Q. XXXII Europa